The northeastern Iberian script, also known as Levantine Iberian or Iberian, was the main means of written expression of the Iberian language. The language is also expressed by the southeastern Iberian script and the Greco-Iberian alphabet. To understand the relationship between northeastern Iberian and southeastern Iberian scripts, one should point out that they are two different scripts with different values for the same signs. However, it is clear they have a common origin and the most accepted hypothesis is that northeastern Iberian script was derived from the southeastern Iberian script. Some researchers have concluded that it is linked to the Phoenician alphabet alone, but others believe the Greek alphabet also had a role.

Typology and variants
All the paleohispanic scripts, with the exception of the Greco-Iberian alphabet, share a common distinctive typological characteristic: they represent syllabic value for the occlusives, and monophonemic value for the rest of the consonants and vowels. In a writing system they are neither alphabets nor syllabaries, but are rather mixed scripts that are normally identified as semi-syllabaries. The basic signary contains 28 signs: 5 vowels, 15 syllabic and 8 consonantic (one lateral, two sibilants, two rhotic and three nasals). The northeastern script was very nearly deciphered in 1922 by Manuel Gómez-Moreno Martínez, who systematically linked the syllabic signs with the occlusive values. The decipherment was based on the existence of a large number of coin legends (some of them bearing Latin inscriptions) that could easily be linked to ancient place names known from Roman and Greek sources. There are two variants of the northeastern Iberian script: the dual variant is almost exclusive to the ancient inscriptions from the 4th and 3rd centuries BCE and its distinctive characteristic is the use of the dual system. This system was discovered by Joan Maluquer de Motes in 1968 and allows differentiation of the occlusive signs (dentals and velars) between voiced and unvoiced by the use of an additional stroke. The simple sign represents the voiced value whilst the complex sign represents the unvoiced value. The non-dual variant is almost exclusive of the modern inscriptions from the 2nd and 1st centuries BCE.

Location of findings
The inscriptions that use the northeastern Iberian script have been found mainly in the northeastern quadrant of the Iberian Peninsula: largely along the coast from Roussillon to Alicante, but also with a deep penetration in the Ebro Valley. The northeastern Iberian inscriptions have been found on different object types (silver and bronze coins, silver and ceramic recipients, lead plaques, mosaics, amphores, stones (steles), spindle-whorls etc.), representing 95% of the total finds (over 2000 items), and nearly all the scripts were written from left to right. The oldest northeastern Iberian script date to the 4th or maybe the 5th century BCE. The modern ones date from the end of the 1st century BCE or maybe the beginning of the 1st century CE.

In recent years four northeastern Iberian abecedaries or signaries have been published: the Castellet de Bernabé signary, the Tos Pelat signary, the Ger signary and the Bolvir signary, all of them belonging to the dual variant of the script.

See also
Greco-Iberian alphabet
Iberian scripts
Paleohispanic scripts
Celtiberian script
Southeastern Iberian script
Tartessian script
Paleohispanic languages
Pre-Roman peoples of the Iberian Peninsula

Notes

Bibliography 

 Correa, José Antonio (1992): «Representación gráfica de la oposición de sonoridad en las oclusivas ibéricas (semisilabario levantino)», AION 14, pp. 253–292.
 Ferrer i Jané, Joan (2005): Novetats sobre el sistema dual de diferenciació gràfica de les oclusives sordes i sonores, Palaeohispanica 5, pp. 957–982.
 Ferrer i Jane Joan (2013): «Els sistemes duals de les escriptures ibèriques», Palaeohispanica 13, pp. 451-479.
 Gómez-Moreno, Manuel (1922): «De Epigrafia ibérica: el plomo de Alcoy», Revista de filología española 9, pp. 34–66.
 Hoz, Javier de (1985): «El nuevo plomo inscrito de Castell y el problema de las oposiciones de sonoridad en ibérico», Symbolae Ludouico Mitxelena septuagenario oblatae, pp. 443–453.
 Maluquer de Motes, Joan (1968): Epigrafía prelatina de la península ibérica, Barcelona.
 Quintanilla, Alberto (1993): «Sobre la notación en la escritura ibérica del modo de articulación de las consonantes oclusivas», Studia Palaeohispanica et Indogermánica J. Untermann ab Amicis Hispanicis Oblata, pp. 239–250.
 Rodríguez Ramos, Jesús (2004): Análisis de epigrafía íbera, Vitoria-Gasteiz.
 Untermann, Jürgen (1990): Monumenta Linguarum Hispanicarum. III Die iberischen Inschriften aus Spanien, Wiesbaden.
 Velaza, Javier (1996): Epigrafía y lengua ibéricas, Barcelona.

External links 

 The levantine Iberian writing- Jesús Rodríguez Ramos

Northeastern Iberian script
Palaeohispanic writing